The little gull (Hydrocoloeus minutus or Larus minutus), is a small gull that breeds in northern Europe and across the Palearctic. The specific  is Latin for "small".

It also has small colonies in parts of southern Canada. It is migratory, wintering on coasts in western Europe, the Mediterranean and (in small numbers) the northeast United States; in recent years non-breeding birds have summered in western Europe in increasing numbers and in 2016 they successfully nested for the first time in Great Britain at the Royal Society for the Protection of Birds reserve at Loch of Strathbeg reserve in Aberdeenshire. As is the case with many gulls, it has traditionally been placed in the genus Larus. It is the only member of the genus Hydrocoloeus, although it has been suggested that Ross's gull also should be included in this genus.

This species breeds colonially on freshwater marshes, making a lined nest on the ground amongst vegetation. Normally 2–6 eggs are laid.

It is pale grey in breeding plumage with a black hood, dark underwings and often a pinkish flush on the breast. In winter, the head goes white apart from a darker cap and eye-spot. The bill is thin and black and the legs dark red. The flight on rounded wings is somewhat tern-like.

Young birds have black markings on the head and upperparts, and "W" pattern across the wings. They take three years to reach maturity.

These gulls pick food off the water surface, and will also catch insects in the air like a black tern.

Gallery

References

External links

 
 
 
 
 
 
 

Gulls
Holarctic birds
Birds described in 1776
Taxa named by Peter Simon Pallas